Monte Azul is a municipality in Minas Gerais, Brazil.

Monte Azul may refer to:
Monte Azul Paulista municipality in São Paulo, Brazil
The NGO Associação Comunitária Monte Azul in São Paulo, Brazil
Monte Azul (ship), a container ship owned by A.P. Moller Singapore Pte. Ltd
Montes Azules-class logistics ship, operated by the Mexican Navy

See also
Mount Blue (disambiguation)